Ishim Steppe (Yesil dalasy) is a plain in the southern part of Western Siberia, between the Irtysh and Tobol rivers. Administratively it is part of Kurgan, Tyumen, and Omsk oblasts in Russia, and the North Kazakhstan Region in Kazakhstan.

Geography
The plain includes the Ishim, after which it is named. The terrain is characterized by a series of crests and hollows, with the ridges extending from the northeast to the southwest.

In the lowlands and valleys there are numerous fresh, bitter, and salt lakes, such as Siletiteniz, Kyzylkak, Teke, Ebeyty and Shaglyteniz, as well as the Krutinsky Lakes, including lakes Tenis-Saltaim, Sazykul and Ik. The smaller lakes and rivers dry up in the summer.

Climate

Flora 
The landscape of the plain is dominated by meadow steppes and birch forests (kolki). The soil consists in leached and normal chernozem and gray forest topsoils. In the south the plain is entirely under cultivation.

References

Grasslands of Kazakhstan
Plains of Kazakhstan
Grasslands of Russia
Eurasian Steppe
Temperate grasslands, savannas, and shrublands
West Siberian Plain